The Bangladesh Girl Guides Association is the national Guiding organization of Bangladesh. It serves 49,975 members (as of 2003).

History
Girlguiding in today's Bangladesh started in 1928 and became  the East Pakistan Branch of the Pakistan Girl Guides Association in 1947. After Bangladesh's independence from Pakistan, the branch organization was reorganized into an independent national organization. The girls-only organization became a full member of the World Association of Girl Guides and Girl Scouts in 1973 and was incorporated on 3 October 1973 by section 2 of the Bangladesh Girl Guides Association Act, 1973 (No XXXI), and that Act makes further provision in relation to the association.

See also
 Bangladesh Scouts

References
Barrett and Malonis. "473 Bangladesh Girl Guides Association". Encyclopedia of Women's Associations Worldwide. Gale Research. 1993.
"Bangladesh Girl Guides Association". Trefoil Round the World. Ninth Edition. World Association of Girl Guides and Girl Scouts. 1992. pp 30 & 31.
The World Encyclopedia of Contemporary Theatre: Asia/Pacific. Routledge. 1998. Reprinted 2000. Paperback 2001. p 85.

World Association of Girl Guides and Girl Scouts member organizations
Scouting and Guiding in Bangladesh
Youth organizations established in 1973